Kalayeh may refer to:
Kalayeh, Rudbar, Gilan Province
Kalayeh, Mazandaran
Kalayeh, Abyek, Qazvin Province
Kalayeh, Alamut-e Gharbi, Qazvin Province
Kalayeh, Rudbar-e Alamut, Qazvin Province